This is a list of missionaries to Hawaii. Before European exploration, the Hawaiian religion was brought from Tahiti by Paʻao according to oral tradition. Notable missionaries with written records below are generally Christian.

Protestant

American Board of Commissioners for Foreign Missions
Several groups were sent from the American Board of Commissioners for Foreign Missions.

First company
The first ABCFM company arrived on March 30, 1820, on the Thaddeus from Boston:

 John Honoree, Hawaiian and schoolmate of Henry Opukahaia 
 Thomas Hopoo, Hawaiian and schoolmate of Henry Opukahaia
 William Tennooe, Hawaiian and schoolmate of Henry Opukahaia
 George Sandwich (Also known as George Tamoree & Prince George) Hawaiian
 Rev. Hiram Bingham I (1789–1869), father of Hiram Bingham II and grandfather of Hiram Bingham III
 Sybil Moseley Bingham (1792–1848), wife of Hiram Bingham I
 Daniel Chamberlain (1782–1881), farmer
 Jerusha Burnap (1787–1879), wife of Daniel Chamberlain
 Thomas Holman (1793–1826), doctor
 Lucia Ruggles Holman (1793–1886), wife of Thomas Holman and sister to Samuel Ruggles, believed to be the first American woman to circumnavigate the globe
 Elisha Loomis (1799–1836), the first printer in Hawaii
 Maria Theresa Sartwell (1796–1862), wife of Elisha Loomis
 Rev. Samuel Ruggles (1795–1871), who brought the first Kona coffee trees to Hawaii in 1828
 Nancy Well (1791–1873), wife of Samuel Ruggles
 Rev. Asa Thurston (1787–1868), grandfather of businessman and politician Lorrin A. Thurston
 Lucy Goodale (1795–1876), wife of Asa Thurston
 Samuel Whitney (1793–1845), father of Henry Martyn Whitney
 Mercy Partridge (1795–1872), wife of Samuel Whitney

Second company
The second ABCFM company arrived on April 23, 1823, on the Thames from New Haven:

 Rev. Artemas Bishop (1795–1872),
 Elizabeth Edwards (1796–1828), wife of Artemas Bishop
 Abraham Blatchley (1787–1860), doctor
 Jemma Marvin (1791–1856), wife of Abraham Blatchley
 Levi Chamberlain (1792–1849), superintendent of secular affairs
 Rev. James Ely (1798–1890), licensed preacher who founded Kealakekua Church, ordained in 1825
 Louisa Everest (1792–1849), wife of James Ely
 Rev. Joseph Goodrich (1794–1852), licensed preacher, ordained in 1826, who founded the Hilo Station
 Martha Barnes (1801–1840), wife of Joseph Goodrich
 Rev. William Richards (1793–1847)
 Clarissa Lyman (1794–1861), wife of William Richards
 Rev. Charles Samuel Stewart (1795–1870), who published a journal
 Harriet Bradford Tiffany Stewart (1798–1830), wife of Charles Samuel Stewart
 Betsey Stockton (1798–1865), the first African American and unmarried female missionary

Third company

The third ABCFM company arrived on March 30, 1828, on the Parthian from Boston:
 Rev. Lorrin Andrews (1795–1868), founder of Lahainaluna Seminary and judge
 Mary Ann Wilson (1804–1879), wife of Lorrin Andrews
 Rev. Ephraim Weston Clark (1799–1878), third pastor of Kawaiahaʻo Church
 Mary Kittredge (1803–1857), wife of Ephraim Weston Clark
 Rev. Jonathan Smith Green (1796–1878), who founded Makawao Union Church
 Theodosia Arnold (1792–1859), wife of Jonathan Smith Green
 Rev. Peter Johnson Gulick (1796–1877)
 Fanny Hinckley Thomas (1798–1883), wife of Peter Gulick
 Dr. Gerrit P. Judd (1803–1873), physician and diplomat
 Laura Fish (1804–1872), wife of Gerrit P. Judd
 Maria Ogden (1792–1874), teacher
 Maria Patton (1803–1880), teacher, married Levi Chamberlain 
 Stephen Shepard (1800–1834), printer
 Margaret Caroline Slow (1801–?), wife of Stephen Shepard
 Mary Ward (1799–1834), teacher, married Edmund Horton Rogers as his second wife
 Delia Stone (1800–1875), teacher, married Artemas Bishop as his second wife

Fourth company
The fourth ABCFM company arrived June 7, 1831 on the New England from New Bedford:
 Rev. Dwight Baldwin (1798–1886), physician on Maui island
 Charlotte Fowler (1805–1873), wife of Dwight Baldwin
 Rev. Sheldon Dibble (1809–1845), historian and Bible translator
 Maria M. Tomlinson (1808–1837), wife of Sheldon Dibble
 Andrew Johnstone (1794–1859), assistant superintendent of secular affairs
 Rebecca Worth (1792–1879), wife of Andrew Johnston
 Rev. Reuben Tinker (1799–1854)
 Mary Throop Wood (1809–1895), wife of Reuben Tinker

Fifth company 

The fifth ABCFM company arrived May 17, 1832 on the Averick from Boston:
 Rev. William Patterson Alexander (1805–1884), whose son founded Alexander & Baldwin
 Mary Ann McKinney (1810–1888), wife of William Patterson Alexander
 Rev. Richard Armstrong (1805–1860), various missions, second pastor of Kawaiahaʻo Church
 Clarissa Chapman (1805–1891), wife of Richard Armstrong
 Alonzo Chapin (1805–1876), physician
 Mary Ann Tenney (1804–1885), wife of Alonzo Chapin
 Rev. John Smith Emerson (1800–1867), founder of Liliuokalani Protestant Church
 Ursula Sophia Newell (1806–1888), wife of John Smith Emerson
 Rev. Cochran Forbes (1805–1880), the founder of Kealakekua Church in 1833
 Rebecca Duncan Smith (1805–1878), Cochran Forbes
 Rev. Harvey Rexford Hitchcock (1800–1855), who founded the first church on Molokaʻi island
 Rebecca Howard (1808–1890), wife of Harvey Rexford Hitchock
 Rev. David Belden Lyman (1803–1868), who founded the Hilo Boarding School
 Sarah Joiner (1806–1885), wife of David Belden Lyman
 Rev. Lorenzo Lyons (1807–1886), who built Imiola Church in Waimea, Hawaii County, Hawaii
 Betsy Curtis (1813–1837), first wife of Lorenzo Lyons
 Edmund Horton Rogers (1806–1853), printer
 Rev. Ephraim Spaulding (1802–1840), who built the house at Waineʻe Church
 Julia Brooks (1810–1898), wife of Ephraim Spaulding

Sixth company
The sixth ABCFM company arrived on May 1, 1833, on the Mentor:
 Rev. John Diell (1808–1841) 
 Caroline Platt (1807–1901), wife of John Diell
 Lemuel Fuller (1810–?), printer
 Rev. Benjamin Wyman Parker (1803–1877)
 Mary Elizabeth Barker (1805–1907), wife of Benjamin Wyman Parker
 Rev. Lowell Smith (1802–1891)
 Abba Willis Tenney (1809–1885), wife of Lowell Smith

Seventh company
The seventh ABCFM company arrived on June 6, 1835, on the Hellespont:
 Lydia Brown (1780–1865), teacher
 Rev. Titus Coan (1808–1881), first pastor of Haili Church in Hilo 
 Fidelia Church (1810–1872), first wife of Titus Coan
 Henry Dimond (1808–1895), bookbinder
 Ann Maria Anner (1808–1893), wife of Henry Dimond
 Edwin Oscar Hall (1810–1883), printer
 Sarah Lyons Williams (1812–1876), first wife of Edwin Oscar Hall
 Elizabeth Maria Hitchcock (1802–1857), teacher, married Edmund Horton Rogers as his second wife

Eighth company
The eighth ABCFM company arrived on April 9, 1837, on the Mary Frasier from Boston:
 Seth Lathrop Andrews (1809–1892), physician
 Parnelly Pierce (1807–1846), wife of Seth Lathrop Andrews
 Edward Bailey (1814–1903), teacher
 Caroline Hubbard (1814–1894), wife of Edward Baily
 Rev. Isaac Bliss (1804–1851)
 Emily Curtis (1811–1865), wife of Isaac Bliss
 Samuel Northrup Castle (1808–1894), who co-founded Castle & Cooke
 Angeline Lorraine Tenney (1810–1841), first wife of Samuel Northrup Castle
 Rev. Daniel Toll Conde (1807–1897)
 Andelucia Lee (1810–1855), wife of Daniel Toll Conde
 Amos Starr Cooke (1810–1871), who founded the Royal School in Honolulu
 Juliette Montague (1812–1896), wife of Amos Starr Cooke and taught at the Royal School
 Rev. Mark Ives (1809–1885)
 Mary Ann Brainerd (1810–1882), wife of Mark Ives
 Rev. Edward Johnson (1813–1867), teacher, ordained 1848
 Lois S. Hoyt (1809–1891), wife of Edward Johnson
 Horton Owen Knapp (1813–1845), teacher
 Charlotte Close (1813–1846), wife of Horton Owen Knapp
 Rev. Thomas Lafon (1801–1876)
 Sophia Louisa Parker (1812–1844), wife of Thomas Lafon
 Edwin Locke (1813–1843), teacher
 Martha Laurens Rowell (1812–1842), wife of Edwin Locke
 Charles MacDonald (1812–1839), teacher
 Harriet Treadwell Halstead (1810–1881), wife of Charles MacDonald
 Bethuel Munn (1803–1849), teacher
 Louisa Clark (1810–1841), wife of Bethuel Munn
 Marcia M. Smith (1806–1896), teacher
 Lucia Garratt Smith (1808–1892), teacher, later married to as his second wife Lorenzo Lyons 
 William Sanford Van Duzee (1811–1883), teacher
 Oral Hobart (1814–1891), wife of William Sanford Van Duzee
 Abner Wilcox (1808–1869), teacher 
 Lucy Eliza Hart (1814–1869), wife of Abner Wilcox
 Two Hawaiian seamen, Joseph and Levi, served as translators

Ninth company

The ninth ABCFM company arrived on May 21, 1841, on the Gloucester:
 Rev. Elias Bond (1813–1896), founded Kalahikiola Church and Kohala Seminary
 Ellen Mariner Howell (1817–1881), wife of Elias Bond
 Rev. Daniel Dole (1808–1878), who founded of Punahou School
 Emily Hoyt Ballard (1808–1844), first wife of Daniel Dole 
 Rev. John Davis Paris (1809–1892), who founded Kahikolu Church and Hale Halawai O Holualoa
 Mary Grant (1807–1847), first wife of John Davis Paris
 William Harrison Rice (1813–1862), teacher
 Mary Sophia Hyde (1816–1911), wife of William Harrison Rice

Tenth company
The tenth ABCFM company arrived on September 24, 1842, on the Sarah Abagail from Boston:
 Rev. George Berkeley Rowell (1815–1884)
 Malvina Jerusha Chapin (1816–1901)
 James William Smith (1810–1887), physician and teacher
 Millicent Knapp Smith (1816–1891), wife of James William Smith

Arrived on October 19, 1842, on the Sarah Abagail from New York:
 Rev. Samuel Chenery Damon (1815–1885), publisher of "The Friend".
 Julia Sherman Mills (1817–1890), wife of Samuel Chenery Damon

Arrived on September 21, 1843, from Boston, originally intended on going to Oregon:
 Rev. Asa Bowen Smith (1809–1886)
 Sarah Gilbert White (1813–1855), wife of Asa Bowen Smith

Eleventh company
The eleventh ABCFM company arrived July 15, 1844 on the Globe from Boston:
 Rev. Claudius Buchanan Andrews (1818–1877)
 Rev. Timothy Dwight Hunt (1840–1895)
 Mary Hedges (died 1857), wife of Timothy Dwight Hunt
 Rev. John Fawcett Pogue (1814–1877)
 Rev. Eliphalet Whittlesey (1816–1889)
 Elizabeth Keane Baldwin (1821–1876), wife of Eliphalet Whittlese

Twelfth company
The twelfth ABCFM company arrived February 26, 1848 on the Samoset from Boston:
 Rev. Samuel Gelston Dwight (1815–1880), stationed in Kaluaʻaha. He married Native Hawaiian Anna Mahoe (1839–1879)
 Rev. Henry Kinney (1816–1854), stationed in Waiohinu
 Maria Louisa Walsworth (1822–1858), wife of Henry Kinney and teacher.  She married businessman Benjamin Pitman after her husband's death

Other arrivals
Arrived in 1854, intended for Micronesia on the Chaica:
 William Cornelius Shipman (1824–1861), stationed in Waiohinu
 Jane Stobie (1827–1904), wife of William Cornelius Shipman

London Missionary Society
From the London Missionary Society (deputation of British missionaries and Tahitian teachers on their way to theMarquesas), they arrive from Tahiti on April 16 and returned to Tahiti on August 27, 1822, on the Mermaid:

Rev, Daniel Tyerman
Rev. George Bennet
 Mary Mercy Moore (1793–1835) spouse of William Ellis.
 Rev. William Ellis (1794–1872), who returned on February 4, 1823, on the Active, toured the islands, and published a book about the tour. He left after about eighteen months in the islands.
Anna and Matatore, Tahitian chiefs and teacher, part of 1822 LMS brief stay
Taua and Tute, Tute, Tahitian teachers, part of 1823 LMS arrival

Anglican Church

Bishop Thomas Nettleship Staley (1823–1898), the first Anglican bishop, arrived in 1862.
Bishop Alfred Willis (1836–1920), the second Anglican bishop, arrived in 1872
Archdeacon George Mason, founder of ʻIolani School, part of the first Anglican mission under Bishop Staley
Rev. Edmund Ibbotson, founder of ʻIolani School, part of the first Anglican mission under Bishop Staley
Rev. William Richard Scott, founder of ʻIolani School (on Lahaina)
Rev. Joseph James Elkington
Rev. Alexander Mackintosh, Canon of the St. Andrew's and principal of the Royal School for many years.
Rev. Thomas Harris (1841–1907), Dean of Honolulu from 1868 to 1870.

Other groups

Methodist Episcopal Church
 Merriman Colbert Harris (1846–1921), the first Methodist bishop

Hawaii Evangelical Association
John M. Lewis, Reverend of Wailuku Union Church from 1898 to 1900

Native Hawaiian Protestant
 
Rev. Samuel C. Luhiau, Sr. (Lo’eau) (1824-1904) was ordained in 1858. He was an: Assistant Reverend to Elias Bond; (1858-1896) Kalahikiola Church and the Kohala Girl's Seminary School at I’ole alongside wife Carrie Kele Luhiau (Nūʻeku) who was also a teacher; Built and erected his own church at Kaipuha’a; Lamaloloa, on his family estate, Kohala’akau; Built Puako Church at Kawaihae. He was a member of the House of Nobles of The Kingdom of Hawai’i during 1887–1889, under King Kalākaua. He was also first cousin to Jane Luhiau (Lo’eau) who married Robert Jasper, then, S. Kaʻelemakule.
 David Malo (1793–1853), historian, built Kilolani Church
 Henry ʻŌpūkahaʻia, who traveled via China to New England and inspired ABCFM
 James Kekela, first ordained Hawaiian Protestant minister
 Bartimeus Lalana Puaʻaiki, first Hawaiian licensed to preach 
 Thomas Hopu, educated at Foreign Mission School and assisted the first ABCFM company 
 John Honolii, educated at Foreign Mission School and assisted the first ABCFM company 
 William Kanui, educated at Foreign Mission School and assisted the first ABCFM company 
 William Kamooula, educated at Foreign Mission School and assisted the second ABCFM company 
 Richard Kalaioulu, educated at Foreign Mission School and assisted the second ABCFM company 
 Kupelii, educated at Foreign Mission School and assisted the second ABCFM company 
 George Tyler Kielaa, educated at Foreign Mission School and assisted the third ABCFM company 
 Samuel J. Mills Paloo, educated at Foreign Mission School and assisted the third ABCFM company 
 John E. Phelps Kalaaauluna, educated at Foreign Mission School and assisted the third ABCFM company
 Jonathan Napela, Uaua and Kaleohano, early Mormon converts, who would later serve as prominent missionaries and leaders in the LDS Church.
 William Hoapili Kaʻauwai (1835–1874), only Native Hawaiian to be ordained a priest of the Anglican Church of Hawaii in 1864

Tahitian Protestant
 Stephen Popohe, educated at Foreign Mission School and assisted the second ABCFM company 
 Henry Tahiti, educated at Foreign Mission School and assisted the third ABCFM company 
 Tute Tehuiariʻi, accompanied Ellis of the London Missionary Society, chaplain to Hawaiian royalty and father of Manaiula Tehuiarii
 Taua, accompanied Ellis of the London Missionary Society
 Taʻamotu, female teacher, accompanied Ellis of the London Missionary Society
 Toteta, Tahitian teacher
 Auna, Tahitian teacher
 Daniel Kahikona, Tahitian teacher

Latter-day Saint
From the Church of Jesus Christ of Latter-day Saints, arriving on December 12, 1850, on the Imaum of Muscat from San Francisco:  
Hiram Clark, Sr. (1795—1853), Mission president from November 1850–February 1851.
Henry Bigler (1815–1900).
Hiram Blackwell
George Q. Cannon (1827–1901).
John Dixon (1818–1853).
William Farrer (1821–1906).
James Hawkins (1818–1894).
James Keeler (1817–1907).
Thomas Morris (1799–1884).
Thomas Levi Whittle (1812–1868).

Roman Catholic

Arrived in 1827 on La Comète from France on an invitation issued by Jean Baptiste Rives:
 Father Alexis Bachelot, SS.CC. (1796–1837), with Fathers Patrick Short, SS.CC., and Abraham Armand, SS.CC., and six lay Brothers of the Congregation

Subsequent bishops and priests:

 Bishop Etienne Jerome Rouchouze, SS.CC. (?–1843), lost at sea
 Bishop Louis Desiré Maigret, SS.CC. (1804–1882)
 Bishop Herman Koeckemann, SS.CC. (1828–1892)
 Bishop Gulstan Ropert, SS.CC. (1839–1903)
 Father Damien de Veuster, SS.CC., (1840–1889), canonized by the Roman Catholic Church in 2009 for dedicating his life to the care of leprosy victims on Molokai, eventually succumbing to the disease himself
 Bishop Libert H. Boeynaems, SS.CC. (1857–1926)
 Bishop Stephen Alencastre, SS.CC. (1876–1940)

Also:
 Mother Marianne Cope, O.S.F., (1838–1918), who led a group of Sisters from her religious congregation in answer to a plea by the King for nursing care of leprosy victims, and who eventually went to Molokai to help Father Damien in his last days and continue his work; beatified by the Catholic Church in 2005, canonized in October 2012
 Brother Joseph Dutton (1843–1931), a lay brother who assisted in Father Damien's work and lived on Molokai from 1886 to his death.
 Sister Leopoldina Burns (1855–1942), O.S.F., companion of Mother Marianne Cope in Molokai who helped care for the lepers and served as educator for girls.

Hawaiian Catholics:
Helio Koaʻeloa (1815–1846), an early Catholic lay catechist known as the "Apostle of Maui".
Petero Mahoe, early Hawaiian catechist
Marie Leahi, early Hawaiian catechumen

Orthodox
 Protopresbyter Jacob Korchinsky (1861–1941), founded the Russian Orthodox Mission in Honolulu, Hawaii in 1915.   He was executed by Soviet authorities in August 1941.   He is under consideration for sainthood in the Russian Orthodox Church.
 Archimandrite Innokenty Dronoff (+1930s to 1940s), served the Russian Orthodox Community in the Hawaiian Islands in the 1930s to 1940s.   His final resting place is unknown.   He was based primarily out of Hilo, Hawaii.

See also

 Congregation of the Sacred Hearts of Jesus and Mary
 Church of Hawaii
 Edict of Toleration (Hawaii)
 Henry Opukahaia
 List of Buddhist temples in Hawaii
 List of Roman Catholic missionaries
 Lists of patriarchs, archbishops, and bishops
 Orthodox Church in Hawaii
 Prefecture Apostolic of the Sandwich Islands
 Roman Catholic Bishop of Honolulu
 The Church of Jesus Christ of Latter-day Saints in Hawaii
 Timeline of Christian missions
 Vicar Apostolic of the Hawaiian Islands

Notes

References

Missionaries to Hawaii
Hawaii